Rod Phillips (born December 23, 1952) is a retired professional American football player who played running back for four seasons for the Los Angeles Rams and St. Louis Cardinals.

References

1952 births
American football running backs
Los Angeles Rams players
St. Louis Cardinals (football) players
Cincinnati Bearcats football players
Jackson State Tigers football players
Living people